Sauromates III (flourished 3rd century, died 232) was a Roman client king of the Bosporan Kingdom. Like many other late Bosporan kings, Sauromates III is known only from coinage, which means his relationship to the other kings is unknown, as are details of his accession and reign. His coins are known from the period 229–232, meaning that he appears to have co-ruled with Cotys III, who might have been his father.

See also
 Bosporan Kingdom
 Roman Crimea

References

232 deaths
3rd-century monarchs in Europe
Sauromates 3
Year of birth unknown
Sauromates 3, Tiberius